The National Bison Range Complex includes four National Wildlife Refuges and the Northwest Montana Wetland Management District, and is located in the northwestern region of Montana in the northwestern United States.

Administration
All of the refuges and associated lands are managed from headquarters at the National Bison Range by the US Fish and Wildlife Service, an agency under the US Department of the Interior. The National Bison Range is located near Moiese, off U.S. Highway 93, and north of Missoula.

Geography
The different units are scattered throughout the Flathead Valley, Mission Valley, and Pleasant Valley. They include habitats of open water and open grasslands, cliff tops and tree tops, pine groves, and quaking aspen groves. Bison herds are protected and supported within them.

Protected areas
Refuges
Lost Trail National Wildlife Refuge
Ninepipe National Wildlife Refuge
Pablo National Wildlife Refuge
Swan River National Wildlife Refuge
Wetlands management
Northwest Montana Wetland Management District
Administration:
National Bison Range

The Ninepipe, Swan River, and Pablo National Wildlife Refuges are not permanently staffed. However, the Lost Trail Refuge and National Bison Range both have interpretive visitor centers and naturalists.

See also

References

External links
 U.S. Fish and Wildlife Service.gov: About the National Bison Range Complex
 

 
National Wildlife Refuges in Montana
Bison herds
Nature reserves in Montana
Protected areas of Flathead County, Montana
Protected areas of Lake County, Montana
Protected areas of Missoula County, Montana
Protected areas of Sanders County, Montana